Battle of Oresund may refer to:

Battle of Svolder, a naval battle fought in September 999 or 1000 in the western Baltic Sea between King Olaf Tryggvason of Norway and an alliance of his enemies, Denmark and Sweden
Battle of the Sound, 1658, during the Second Northern War, near the Sound or Oresund, just north of Copenhagen involving Sweden, Denmark and the Netherlands